Elizabeth A. Barnes is an American climate scientist. Barnes is best known for her work and expertise on the use of statistical methods to understand the variability of Earth's short- and long-term climate. Her work is characterized by an integration of both physics and computer science approaches. She is a Fellow of the American Geophysical Union.

Early life and education 
Barnes grew up in Minnesota. She earned two bachelor's degrees, summa cum laude, at the University of Minnesota, where she studied mathematics and physics. She went on to earn a PhD in Atmospheric science from the University of Washington, where she specialized in eddy mean flow interactions of the midlatitude jet stream. Following her graduate studies, Barnes accepted a National Oceanic and Atmospheric AdministrationClimate and Global Change post-doctoral fellowship, located at the Lamont Doherty Earth Observatory at Columbia University.

Research and career 
While a post-doctoral fellow at Columbia University, Barnes led research that explored the relationship of ongoing anthropogenic climate change and Arctic amplification, changes to Northern Hemisphere circulation, and the future of extreme events

In 2013, Barnes joined the faculty of the Department Atmospheric Science at Colorado State University. As of October 2022, Barnes had led or co-authored more than 115 scholarly journal articles. Notably, Barnes was an early adopter of machine-learning methods for understanding climate variability and change. This work has been recognized as "trustworthy, authoritative and expertly targeted to make real, concrete advances" in the understanding of the climate system.

Barnes' research lab has worked broadly in the field of climate science, including making major contributions to explainable artificial intelligence (XAI) for earth science, subseasonal-to-decadal predictability, climate intervention, climate change and sustainability, large-scale atmospheric dynamics, and causal discovery.

Selected Awards and honours 
 2021 Macelwane Medal, American Geophysical Union
 2021 Fellow, American Geophysical Union
 2021 Faculty Excellence Award, College of Engineering, Colorado State University
 2020 Turco Lectureship, American Geophysical Union
 2020 Clarence Leroy Meisinger Award, American Meteorological Society
 2018 CAREER Award, National Science Foundation
 2016 George T. Abell Outstanding Early-Career Faculty Award
 2016 Outstanding Professor of the Year, Department of Atmospheric Science, Colorado State University
 2014 James R. Holton Junior Scientist Award, American Geophysical Union

References 

American climatologists
People from Minnesota
University of Minnesota alumni
Living people
Year of birth missing (living people)
Women climatologists